, sometimes known as , was a poet and the Empress consort of Emperor Nintoku, who was the 16th Emperor of Japan, according to the traditional order of succession. She was a descendant of Emperor Kōgen.

No firm dates can be assigned to Emperor Nintoku's life or reign, nor to that of his first wife.  Nintoku is considered to have ruled the country during the late-fourth century and early-fifth century, but there is a paucity of information about him. There is insufficient material available for further verification and study.

Princess Iwa's poetry, or poems attributed to her, are included in the Kojiki, the Nihon Shoki and the Man'yōshū. Her tomb is said to be located in Nara Prefecture.

Literature
Poems which Iwa-no hime is said to have exchanged with her husband are related in the Kojiki and in the Nihon Shoki.  Nintoku is reported to have suffered the resentment of the Iwa-no hime during a period in which he stopped the collection of taxes, which meant that even ordinary repairs to the palace were also deferred.

Poetry attributed to Iwa is collected in the Man'yōshū, the oldest existing collection of Japanese poetry believed to have been collected by Ōtomo no Yakamochi (大伴 家持). In her four songs she expressed love and longing for her husband. Some modern scholars, however, advise a healthy skepticism in these difficult to verify attributions.

Burial mound tomb
The Imperial tomb of Iwa no hime no Mikoto is said to be located in Saki-chō in the city of Nara. Both kofun-type Imperial tombs are characterized by a keyhole-shaped island located within a wide, water-filled moat.

Issue
Prince Ooe no Izahowake (大兄去来穂別尊) Emperor Richū
Prince Suminoe no Nakatsu (住吉仲皇子)
Prince Mizuhawake (瑞歯別尊) Emperor Hanzei
Prince Oasatsuma wakugo no Sukune (雄朝津間稚子宿禰尊) Emperor Ingyō

Notes

References
 Brownlee, John S. and Tarō Sakamoto. (1991).  The Six National Histories of Japan. Vancouver: University of British Columbia Press. ]
 Cranston, Edwin A. (1998).  A Waka Anthology: The Gem-Glistening Cup. Stanford: Stanford University Press. 
 Hall, John Whitney, Delmer M. Brown, Marius Jansen. (1993).  The Cambridge History of Japan: Ancient Japan. Cambridge: Cambridge University Press. 
 Nussbaum, Louis-Frédéric and Käthe Roth. (2005).  Japan encyclopedia. Cambridge: Harvard University Press. ;  OCLC 58053128
 
 Titsingh, Isaac. (1834).  Annales des empereurs du Japon (Nihon Ōdai Ichiran).  Paris: Royal Asiatic Society, Oriental Translation Fund of Great Britain and Ireland. OCLC 5850691 
 Varley, H. Paul. (1980).  Jinnō Shōtōki: A Chronicle of Gods and Sovereigns. New York: Columbia University Press. ;  OCLC 59145842

People of Kofun-period Japan
4th-century women writers
4th-century writers
Japanese empresses
Ancient Japanese women
4th-century Japanese people
4th-century Japanese women